Seán Delargy (born 1982) is a Northern Irish hurler who played as a left corner-back for the Antrim senior team.

Delargy made his first appearance for the team during the 2002 National League and was a regular member of the starting fifteen until his retirement after the 2011 championship. During that time he won five Ulster winners' medals.

At club level Delargy is a two-time Ulster medalist with Ruairí Óg Cushendall. In addition to this he has also won three county championship winners' medals.

References

1982 births
Living people
Ruairi Og Cushendall hurlers
Antrim inter-county hurlers
Ulster inter-provincial hurlers